Sanjay Mitra may refer to:

 Sanjay Mitra (actor), Indian film actor
 Sanjay Mitra (civil servant) (born 1959), Indian Defence Secretary since 2017